Im Sang-ok (Korean: 임상옥, 林尙沃) (1779–1855) was a trader in the middle of Joseon Dynasty. His Bon-gwan is Jeonju, Ja is Gyeongyak (경약, 景若), Ho is (가포, 稼圃). He was born in Uiju, Pyeonganbukdo.

Early life 
Im Sang-ok was born in 1779 (Jeongjo year 3), as a son of Im Bong-haek who was a merchant in Uiju. His ancestors lived in Anju (안주), later moved to Uiju. Their family was a merchants family. Im Bong-haek, wanted to be official translator, so he was good at Chinese language and Machu language. Im Sang-ok learned Chinese and Manchu from him. At the time, ginseng was popular product in Qing, as a medicine. Im Bong-haek was a smuggling merchant who followed bureaucrat to Qing every year, sold ginseng, bought silk and sold it in Joseon again. However, he could not succeed in his business, all his family ended up becoming slaves under the government. After he worked as an errand boy under a merchant Dobang, one day he had gain trust from him. When Im Sang-ok became age of 28, his father Im Bong-haek died, he had to solve all his father's debt. He started smuggling dealing with Chinese merchants, by using skills he learned from his dad.

Business life 
In 1809, Im Sang-ok went to meet the bureaucrat Park Jong-gyeong to get help from him for the business. After their meeting Im Sang-ok he got monopoly right for ginseng trade with other five merchants in Uiju.

In 1810, when he went to Qing as assistant of an envoy, he sold ginseng with tens of times of normal price. Thanks to that he was recommended to be bureaucrat, but he refused.

In 1812, he helped protecting the castle from rebellion of Hong Gyeong-nae.

In his 30s, he became the leader of merchants based on Uiju.

He accumulated much wealth, he helped poor people.

In 1832, as an award of helping people, he became mayor of Gwaksan.

In 1834,When there was water flood, Im Sang-ok supplied foods and clothes for victims, also he donated money to government office, it helped them to make roads and ships to improve transport and convenience. So that he became high bureaucrat, but cause of objection of Border Defense Council, he retired soon.

He lived his rest of life for helping poor people, writing poetry, and drinking alcohol.

Before his death, he made his private land to land for palace, preventing to be sold, for his descendants. Later, this land becomes Bul-i farm by his descendant.

Also he forgave all the debts the merchants owed to him, giving them gold instead.

His two siblings and one of his sons died early.

Historical background 
Joseon had the worst environment for merchants to do the business. Many products were forbidden to trade, and most of trades between other countries were illegal. But ginseng from Joseon was popular in Qing, the Chinese willingly paid a lot for it. It was very appealing deal for merchants, so Im Sang-ok smuggled ginseng with Chinese.

Since old times, Korean ginseng had been widely known for its excellent quality. Also Chinese people thought they have to eat ginseng in order to live longer. There's a story in Wi-Am-Mun-Go (위암문고, 韋庵文稿)

Sampo was created in Gaesong at the beginning, and it was called Songsam. At first, people just sold it as a row baeksam in Beijing, and it made the Chinese vomit. So people didn't eat it, believing it to be poisonous. Then one guy in Songdo found out how to make ginseng, from boiling baeksam. There were few affects making people sick, it was less likely to be rotten. It became popular, the profit was ten times of baeksam when it is sold.

Basically, there was a limit that can be brought to Qing when u take ginseng and silver, Hence, you could hide as much as you can, and when you pass the gate to Qing you can lobby him a bit then you would easily pass. So every year lots of amount of ginseng and silver were taken out of Joseon, there were lack of them to use internally. So that the government decided to give ginseng trade right to Qing only to six merchants, including Hong deuk-ju and Im Sang-ok. At the time, there were silver 420,000 nyang which the government stored, and the amount of money for ginseng trade was silver 1,000,000 nyang.

There were Naesang (내상,萊商) based on Busan, Gyeongsang (경상,京商) based on Seoul, Songsang (송상,松商) based on Gaeseong, Mansang (만상,灣商). and Im Sang-ok became the leader of Mansang in his 30s. Mansang had special rights for ginseng trade, but they didn't stay just in ginseng, they had international trade freely.

Critics 
He is considered as who overcame the limit of hierarchy, advanced to Jong 3 Pum (종3품)

He inspired business men later, because he focused on not only profit, but also people who he dealt with. Trust was more important than profit for him. He didn't show off his wealth, he disposed all his wealth and had only one farm for vegetables when he died.

But when he started his ginseng business, he lobbied the bureaucrat and got the monopoly right, it is illegal indeed even that time.

He tried to help poor people, did charities, but according to fact that he supported government forces when there was Hong Gyung-rae's Rebellion, he was conservative to revolution of corrupted tradition in Joseon.

Quotes 
“Once you are born, once you die indeed. Life and Death is equally given joy and punishment for everyone. Big business has certain way which merchants have to follow. Troubles you have, various good and bad varies by the way of commerce. If you lose the way, your business can’t ever be succeeded.”

And then Im Sang-ok heard that Chusa Kim Jeong-hee visits Beijing, he went to talk with him. 'Baek chuk gan du jin il bo (백척간두 진일보, 百尺竿頭 進一步)’, ‘Baek chuk gan du (백척간두, 百尺竿頭)’ means very dangerous situation as you are standing on the end of a bamboo. ‘Jin il bo (진일보, 進一步)’ means go one step ahead. It means, face a fear, risk your life, then you can find your way.

Jae sang pyeong yeo su(재상평야수, 材上平如水)

On the wealth, it is flat as water,

In jung jik sa hyung(인중직사형,  人中直似衡)

Among people, straight like balances.

Sang juk in (상즉인, 商卽人)

Business produce people, not profit.

He also wrote a poem.

三更官燭怯春寒 한밤 촛불은 차가운 봄날씨에 놀라 떠는데

In the middle of night, candle light shakes surprised by cold spring weather.

經歲相逢話萬端 해를 넘겨 그대 만나니 할 말이 많으나

Met you after a year, have a lot to say

去後西州長短事 길고 짧던 세상일, 한번 서주로 가버린 뒤

long and short things in the world, after gone to Seoju once

永淸橋上月團團 영청교 다리 위로 달만 두둥실 떴네

There is the moon on above Yeongcheong bridge.

Story 
After Im Sang-ok's father died, he had all the father's debt, so he worked as assistant under merchant Hong Deukju. In Uiju, there's tradition that they don't pay for employee, but after five, ten years, if they think the employee have a potential, they support him to have his own business. If he's not diligent it was common to be expelled getting nothing. Im Sang-ok could had business just after three years with getting support from Hong Deukuju. So he went to Beijing to have a business. And he saw prostitute quarter and bought one woman for a night. He didn't do anything to her and she got impressed and asked his name. Im Sang-ok spent all his money for that. And then later Im Sang-ok was criticized a lot, got expelled from merchant group. Ten years later, the woman became wife of high bureaucrat in Qing, and found Im Sang-ok, gave him ten times of money he spent for buying her. Using that money, Im Sang-ok could had success on his business.

One man brought big ginseng and asked Im Sang-ok to valuate it. Im Sang-ok looked the ginseng with morning sunshine and answered correct that it was transplanted to somewhere else and grown. So people call Im Sang-ok Bak mul gun ja(박물군자, 博物君子) (someone with deep knowledge in everything) and no one tried to cheat on him.

Ater he got age 40, Im Sang-ok realized that the country is not enough to have his all wealth, he enjoyed his life writing poems. It was meaningless for him to have wealth or high status.

Once, Do-jeong Hong Mi-San broke his precious coral cane during his journey. The cane wasn't his, he borrowed it from his friend for the journey. Moreover, it was something difficult to get in Qing, that it was almost impossible to get it in Joseon. By that time, someone told him that there is everything in Im Sang-ok's warehouse. So Hong Mi-San went to Im Sang-ok right away, Im Sang-ok was told about his story, he opened his warehouse and let Hong Mi-San take one of his many coral canes.

Also, the other day, Ui-Ju Bu-Yoon's decoration jade got broke, he went to Im Sang-ok's warehouse, and there were hundreds of jades.

There was a high bureaucrat Park Jonggyung, who is uncle of the king. And when his one of parents died, Im Sang-ok went to visit him even though they've never met before. Im Sang-ok lobbied him 5000 nyang, which is multiple times of amount others lobbied him. Park Jonggyung called Im Sang-ok to his house and asked him if he knows how many people come and go in a day, and Im Sang-ok said there are only two people, who can bring advantage to him or who can bring damage to him. Park Jonggyung liked his answer and thought he has potential. Later he supported him doing his business.

When Im Sang-ok became rich in his late 30s, he built a house which has hundreds of rooms under mountain Sambong in Uiju. It took five years to build and he wanted to have all his relatives and underlings there. But no one could build a house which has over 99 rooms except the King, so Amhaengeosa (royal secret agent) had all his house destroyed and Im Sang-ok had to go to jail. It was hard being rich for who is in low position.

When Im Sang-ok left the temple, monk Suk-Sung of Chuwolam gave him a glass for wine, which is called Gyeyoungbae, it make liquid leak to bottom when its filled over 80%of its volume. Im Sang-ok controlled his greed remembering that glass.

One day, he saw one kite caught a chicken, and he realized that his death is soon to come. After that, he called merchants who owed on him and forgave all the debts they had, giving them golds, saying “When you try to possess a water, water loses its life and gets rotten. So is wealth. Wealth just stays for a while for you. So is person. There's no difference for people from the birth, how precious, how rich, how noble, how beautiful. The debt is as water. You can’t have him as who owed you, when you give your water to who is thirsty."

When Im Sang-ok went to Beijing to sell ginseng, there was one problem with ginseng trade, the price. Chinese merchant bought ginseng brought by merchants from Joseon, with cheap price. Chinese merchants knew its illegal for Joseon merchants and it's risky so that they must sell it before returning. And one day Chinese merchants became jealous of Im Sang-ok that he has monopoly right to sell ginseng, so they boycotted Im Sang-ok and make him lower the price more. Im Sang-ok had grievance about this situation. So Im Sang-ok burned his ginseng in his yard, called Chinese merchants. Frightened, they bought ginseng at a high price. So Im Sang-ok made lot of profit and became popular. So he could get ginseng trade monopoly right, later he could be recommended as bureaucrat.

Im Sang-ok was planning to go to Beijing, so he called his staff. But the staff didn't seem to want to go to Beijing saying that he is sick. Im Sang-ok later noticed that he actually got robbed his all products and the money he lent from the rich. so Im Sang-ok scolded him that he have to go Beijing and earn money to compensate the money he lent, but he didn't want. So Im Sang-ok got annoyed and scolded him, and went to Beijing alone. When he saw the rich who his staff lent money from, he heard that his staff died and a rich wanted to give him more money to support him, so when Im Sang-ok went back to Joseon, he visited his staff. And his son said his father died, after he met Im Sang-ok he got shocked and got ill. He realized that he shouldn't say anything can cause bad happening.

One day, Bureaucrat from Jeonju visited Im Sang-ok, and asked him to lend him money. They met first time, didn't know each other, but he asked him 50,000 nyang. But Im Sang-ok let him take his money. The bureaucrat got impressed and promised him to give it back later. And the reason why Im Sang-ok let his money to him was that he realized the bureaucrat seemed was about to kill him if he doesn't let him take his money. And then it was revealed that the bureaucrat was caught stealing money, so he could die if he don't return the money back and he actually had knife in his pocket.

The rebel Hong Gyung-rae was planning to make rebellion, he was trying to have the riches as his team. So he went to work as scribe under Im Sang-ok. He didn't make first move, just worked. One day, some high bureaucrat and their company visited Im Sang-ok, they were 700 people. Every workers in Im Sang-ok's house were nervous to support lot of people, but only Hong Gyung-rae was calm. After the group left, Im Sang-ok called Hong Gyung-rae and told him to quit the job in his house. He thought his ability is too big to stay being as scribe under him. Then 1812, Hong Gyung-rae launched the rebellion against an oppressive tax regime enforced by the centrally appointed bureaucrats from Seoul, collecting more than the allotted amount of grain from the famine stricken region of Pyeongan province. But Im Sang-ok helped government forces, supporting money for armies and foods. The rebellion of Hong Gyung-rae was repressed, Im Sang-ok was recommended as high bureaucrat.

Publish 

 〈가포집〉 Gapojip
 〈적중일기(寂中日記)〉 Jeok jung il gi

Media

Novel Sangdo  
Sangdo by Choi In-ho is published in 2000 (여백미디어)

Drama Sangdo, Merchants of Joseon 
Drama series which was broadcast by MBC, restructured ‘Sang-do’ by Choi In-ho, whose story is based on Im Sang-ok.

Drama Business magnate Im Sangok (거상 임상옥) 
In 1976, 거상 임상옥 was broadcast as a daily drama on MBC.

Comics Toad Seodang (맹꽁이 서당)
When Hong Gyung-rae's Rebellion is mentioned, Im Sang-ok is described in the scene; he says that Hong Gyung-rae has too much potential to work as houseworker.

References 

1779 births
1885 deaths
People from Uiju County
Slave owners
19th-century Korean businesspeople
Slavery in Korea